Paulo Afonso Miessa, better known by his stage name Paulo Goulart (9 January 1933 – 13 March  2014) was a Brazilian actor.

Family
He was married to Brazilian actress Nicette Bruno from 1958 until his death in 2014; the couple had three children. He was a member of the Spiritist community.

Career

Film

1954: Destino em Apuros
1957: Rio Zona Norte .... Moacir
1958: O Cantor e o Milionário .... Paulo
1958: Cala a Boca, Etelvina .... Adelino
1958: Pista de Grama
1958: O Grande Momento .... Vitório
1958: O Barbeiro Que Se Vira .... Leonardo
1958: E o Bicho não Deu .... Delegado Faria
1960: E Eles não Voltaram
1962: Nordeste Sangrento
1972: A Marcha
1974: A Cobra Está Fumando
1979: Os Trombadinhas .... Frederico
1983: Gabriela, Cravo e Canela .... João Fulgêncio
1984: Para Viver um Grande Amor .... Eugênio
1989: Kuarup
1989: Faca de Dois Gumes .... Delegado Olímpio Veloso
1989: Solidão, Uma Linda História de Amor
1998: Vila Isabel (Short)
2000: O Auto da Compadecida .... Major Antônio Moraes
2000: Soluços e Soluções
2004: Redentor .... Ministro
2005: Tapete Vermelho .... Caminhoneiro
2005: Xuxinha e Guto contra os Monstros do Espaço .... São Pedro (voice)
2010: Chico Xavier
2010: Luz nas Trevas: A Volta do Bandido da Luz Vermelha
2010: Nosso lar .... Ministro
2013: Giovanni Improtta .... Juiz Walcyr
2013: Time and the Wind .... Coronel Amaral Neto (final film role)

Television

1952: Helena
1966: Anjo Marcado (TV Excelsior) .... Dr. César Galvão
1966: As Minas de Prata (TV Excelsior) .... Dom Francisco
1967: Os Fantoches (TV Excelsior) .... Marcos
1968: O Terceiro Pecado (TV Excelsior) .... Clemente
1968: A Muralha (TV Excelsior) .... Bento Coutinho
1969: Vidas em Conflito (TV Excelsior) .... Walter
1969: A Cabana do Pai Tomás (Rede Globo) .... Pierre St. Clair
1970: Verão Vermelho (Rede Globo) .... Flávio
1970: A Próxima Atração (Rede Globo) .... Tomás
1971: Quarenta Anos Depois (Rede Record) .... Santiago
1972: Signo da Esperança (TV Tupi)
1972: Uma Rosa com Amor (Rede Globo) .... Claude Antoine Geraldi
1976: Um Sol Maior (TV Tupi) .... Rangel
1977: Éramos Seis (TV Tupi) .... Doutor Azevedo
1977: Papai Coração (TV Tupi) .... Mário
1979: Gaivotas (TV Tupi) .... Carlos
1980: Plumas e Paetês (Rede Globo) .... Gino
1981: Jogo da Vida (Rede Globo) .... Silas Ramos Cruz
1984: Transas e Caretas (Rede Globo) .... Roberto
1986: Roda de Fogo (Rede Globo) .... Marcos Labanca
1988: Chapadão do Bugre (mini-series - TV Bandeirantes) .... Capitão Eucaristo Rosa
1988: Fera Radical (Rede Globo) .... Altino Flores
1990: Gente Fina (Rede Globo) .... Joaquim
1991: O Dono do Mundo (Rede Globo) .... Altair
1992: Despedida de Solteiro (Rede Globo) .... delegado
1993: Mulheres de Areia (Rede Globo) .... Donato
1994: Incidente em Antares (mini-series - Rede Globo) .... Tibério Vacariano
1994: As Pupilas do Senhor Reitor (SBT) .... Dom Arlindo
1995: A Idade da Loba (TV Bandeirantes) .... Zé Rubens
1996: O Campeão (TV Bandeirantes) .... Felipe Caldeira
1997: Zazá (Rede Globo) .... Ulisses
1999: O Auto da Compadecida (mini-series) .... Major Antônio Moraes
2000: Aquarela do Brasil (mini-series) .... Gabriel Laguardia
2001: A Padroeira .... Dom Lourenço de Sá
2002: O Quinto dos Infernos (mini-series) .... José Bonifácio
2002: Esperança .... Farina
2003: Sítio do Picapau Amarelo .... Bartolomeu Bueno da Silva
2004: Um Só Coração (mini-series) .... Avelino
2004: O Pequeno Alquimista (special) .... Rei
2005 América .... Mariano de Oliveira
2006 JK (mini-series) .... Israel Pinheiro
2006 Pé na Jaca .... Vilela
2007 Amazônia, de Galvez a Chico Mendes (mini-series) .... Tavares
2007 Duas Caras .... Heriberto Gonçalves
2009 Cama de Gato .... Severo Tardivo
2011 Morde & Assopra .... Eliseu

Voice Acting
 Aslam - The Chronicles of Narnia: The Lion, the Witch and the Wardrobe (Brazilian Version)

References

External links
 
 

1933 births
2014 deaths
Brazilian male telenovela actors
Brazilian male voice actors
Brazilian male film actors
People from Ribeirão Preto
20th-century Brazilian male actors
21st-century Brazilian male actors
Deaths from liver cancer
Deaths from cancer in São Paulo (state)
Brazilian spiritualists